Tom yum or tom yam is a type of hot and sour Thai soup, usually cooked with shrimp or prawn.

The words "tom yam" are derived from two Thai words. Tom refers to the boiling process, while yam means 'mixed'. Tom yum is characterised by its distinct hot and sour flavours, with fragrant spices and herbs generously used in the broth. The soup is also made with fresh ingredients such as lemongrass, kaffir lime leaves, galangal, lime juice, fish sauce, and crushed red chili peppers. The tom yum seasoning has been investigated as a potential functional food and a natural antimicrobial because of its kaffir lime leaf and red chili content.

Commercial tom yum paste is made by crushing all the herb ingredients and stir frying in oil, then adding seasoning and other preservative ingredients.The paste is bottled or packaged and sold around the world. Tom yum flavored with the paste may have different characteristics from that made with fresh herb ingredients. The soup often includes meats such as shrimp, chicken, or pork.

Preparation
The taste of tom yum is based on sour and spicy flavors. A paste called nam prik pao is prepared as a base of the soup, to which water, herbs and meat are added. The nam prik pao is made from roasted chilies, shallots, and garlic and the ingredients are best grilled on a charcoal fire.

The basic ingredient of tom yum is shrimp or pork. The most popular tom yum base is river shrimp called tom yum goong.

The essential ingredients of tom yum are herbs such as lemongrass, galangal, and kaffir lime leaves. Other ingredients are also important, especially Thai chilies, mushroom, coriander leaf (cilantro), tomatoes, sweet white onions, lime juice, sugar, and fish sauce. Tom yum nam khon is a variety with coconut milk or evaporated milk.

Selected types

Tom yam nam sai , clear broth tom yam soup
Tom yam nam khon is a more recent variation from the 1980s. common with prawns as a main ingredient, evaporated milk or non-dairy creamer powder is added to the broth as a finishing touch. 
Tom yam kathi – coconut milk-based tom yum—this is often confused with tom kha kai ("chicken galanga soup"), where galangal is the dominant flavour of the coconut milk-based soup.
tom yam kung – the version of the dish most popular among tourists, is made with prawns as the main ingredient. The dish originated during the Rattanakosin Kingdom.
Tom yam pla is a clear fish soup that was traditionally eaten with rice. It used to be the most widespread form of tom yam before mass-tourism came to Thailand, for fresh fish is readily available almost everywhere in the region's rivers, canals and lakes as well as in the sea. Usually fish with firm flesh that doesn't crumble after boiling is preferred for this type of soup.
Tom yam gai is the chicken version of the soup.
Tom yam po taek or tom yam thale is a variant of the soup with mixed seafood, like prawns, squid, clams and pieces of fish.
Tom yam kung maphrao on nam khon, a version of prawn tom yum with the meat of a young coconut and a dash of (coconut) milk.
Tom yam kha mu, made with pork leg. These require a long cooking time under low fire.

In the modern popularized versions the soup also contains mushrooms—usually straw mushrooms or oyster mushrooms. The soup is often topped with a generous sprinkling of fresh chopped cilantro (coriander leaves). Sometimes Thai chili jam (nam phrik phao) is added: this gives the soup a bright orange color and makes the chili flavor more pronounced.

Other spicy and sour soups
Less well known outside Thailand is tom khlong (ต้มโคล้ง), a spicy sour soup where the sourness does not derive from lime juice but through the use of tamarind. Tom som are soups that are also very similar to tom yum but most often do not contain lemongrass or kaffir lime leaves. Depending on the type of tom som, the acidity can be derived from lime juice or from the use of tamarind.

Outside Thailand

Malaysia
Tom yum, locally spelled as tomyam, is very well-received among Malaysians since its introduction around the 1980s. The cuisine is now considered a must-have on most restaurant menus in Malaysia, especially the peninsular states. As of 2018, the popularity of Tom yum and other Thai dishes had brought employment to at least 120,000 south Thai cooks, working restaurants mainly in Selangor state and the capital city of Kuala Lumpur, and owning 5000 to 6000 Thai restaurants throughout the country.

See also
 Tom kha
 Thai cuisine
 Malay cuisine
 List of soups
 List of Thai ingredients
 Three grand soups

References

External links

Thai soups
National dishes
Spicy foods